A lens cover or lens cap provides protection from scratches and minor collisions for camera and camcorder lenses. Lens covers come standard with most cameras and lenses. Some mobile camera phones include lens covers, such as the Sony Ericsson W800, the Sony Ericsson K750 and the Sony Ericsson K550.

A more secure lens cap is the metal screw-in lens cap which cannot pop off a lens accidentally.  Although a screw-in cap takes more time to remove in order to take a photograph than a standard lens cap, it is stronger than plastic and therefore more protective.

Some cameras (mostly compact cameras) feature an automatic lens cap that opens when the camera is powered on, they often use plastic blades and thus do not offer much protection against damage.

Friction fit lens caps exist but are quite rare.

Lens caps or covers are often lost, they are not a high value item among photographers, especially professionals, photographers at large events or in large crowds may drop their lens caps and fail to retrieve them, leading to a litter of lens caps.

A lens cap may be tethered to the camera via a string to avoid losing it.

Aside from lens caps, there are also rear caps and body caps, these are used in interchangeable lens cameras and allow protection for the lenses rear element and the shutter/sensor of the camera in storage.

See also
Lens hood

Photography equipment